McPherson v. Blacker, 146 U.S. 1 (1892), was a United States Supreme Court case decided on October 17, 1892. The case concerned a law passed in Michigan which divided the state into separate congressional districts and awarded one of the state's electoral votes to the winner of each district. The suit was filed by several of these electors chosen in the 1892 election, including William McPherson, against Robert R. Blacker, the Secretary of State of Michigan. It was the first Supreme Court case to consider whether certain methods of states' appointments of their electors were constitutional. The Court, in a majority opinion authored by Chief Justice Melville Fuller, upheld Michigan's law, and more generally gave state legislatures plenary power over how they appointed their electors. The Court held that Article Two of the United States Constitution also constrains the ability of each state to limit the ability of its state legislators to decide how to appoint their electors.

Impact in Bush v. Gore (2000)

The ability of states to determine the selection and apportionment of their electors was later reaffirmed in another Supreme Court case, Bush v. Gore (2000). McPherson was also cited in Bush v. Gore by both George W. Bush and by Chief Justice William H. Rehnquist in his concurring opinion. Rehnquist admonished that "in a Presidential election the clearly expressed intent of the legislature must prevail."

Impact in 2020 post-election legal disputes

The plenary power of State legislatures to appoint electors, as affirmed in McPherson, and as originally given in Article 2 of the U.S. Constitution, was suggested as a means to settle the 2020 presidential election. This power, it was also argued, has usually been delegated to the people's vote, but the power can be recovered if the existence of fraud can be proven and/or if the legislatures' election statutes have been violated or circumvented, rendering the election illegal.

 

On December 11, 2020, the Supreme Court denied the state of Texas's motion to file a bill of complaint against four states, Pennsylvania, Michigan, Wisconsin, and Georgia, that had awarded their electoral votes to President-elect Joe Biden. 

On December 5, Republican Speaker of the Arizona House of Representatives Rusty Bowers pointed out, "it is true that the Arizona Legislature could alter the method of appointing electors prospectively. But it cannot undo the election of electors whom the voters already voted for ... the law does not authorize the Legislature to reverse the results of an election ... I cannot and will not entertain a suggestion that we violate current law to change the outcome of a certified election." The Commonwealth of Pennsylvania said in response to the Texas suit:

References

External links
 

United States Supreme Court cases
United States Supreme Court cases of the Fuller Court
United States elections case law
1892 in United States case law
United States Electoral College